The 2001 European Grand Prix (formally the 2001 Warsteiner Grand Prix of Europe) was a Formula One motor race held on 24 June 2001 at the Nürburgring, Nürburg, Germany. It was the ninth race of the 2001 Formula One season. It is also the last race held on this layout, before the circuit was modified in 2002. The 67-lap race was won by Michael Schumacher driving for Ferrari after starting from pole position. Juan Pablo Montoya finished second driving for Williams, with David Coulthard third driving for McLaren.

The race was Michael Schumacher's fifth win of the season, his third at the Nürburgring, and the result meant that he extended his lead in the Drivers' Championship to 24 points over Coulthard and 42 ahead of Rubens Barrichello. Ferrari maintained their lead in the Constructors' Championship, 41 points ahead of McLaren and 57 ahead of Williams, with 8 races of the season remaining.

Background
The Grand Prix was contested by 22 drivers, in eleven teams of two. The teams, also known as constructors, were Ferrari, McLaren, Williams, Benetton, BAR, Jordan, Arrows, Sauber, Jaguar, Minardi and Prost.

Before the race, Ferrari driver Michael Schumacher led the Drivers' Championship with 58 points; McLaren driver David Coulthard was second on 40 points. Behind them in the Drivers' Championship, Rubens Barrichello was third on 24 points in the other Ferrari, with Ralf Schumacher and Mika Häkkinen on 22 and 8 points respectively. In the Constructors' Championship, Ferrari were leading on 82 points and McLaren were second on 48 points, with Williams third on 28 points.

Following the Canadian Grand Prix on June 10, the teams conducted testing sessions at the Silverstone circuit from June 12–14. Jarno Trulli (Jordan) set the fastest time on the first day with Olivier Panis (BAR) topping the second day's running, setting a time of 1:22.803 and test driver Alexander Wurz (McLaren) was fastest on the final day, setting a time of 1:22.081, over six-tenths of a second faster than Häkkinen.

There was one driver change heading into the race. Having missed the previous Grand Prix due to a headache and dizziness resulting from a crash at the second free practice session of the Canadian Grand Prix, Jordan driver Heinz-Harald Frentzen was declared fit to race by the FIA Medical Delegate Sid Watkins and returned to his seat taken over by temporary replacement Ricardo Zonta. Similarly, Jaguar driver Eddie Irvine was suffering from a strained neck and Sauber driver Nick Heidfeld was suffering from headaches; both were passed fit to race.

In technical developments, Benetton announced that the team would use traction control on both their cars, which were tested during the Friday practice sessions.

Practice
Four practice sessions were held before the Sunday race—two on Friday, and two on Saturday. The Friday morning and afternoon sessions each lasted an hour. The third and final practice sessions were held on Saturday morning and lasted 45 minutes. The Friday practice sessions were held in overcast conditions, clearing up later in the day. Coulthard was fastest in the first session, with a time of 1:16.888, one-tenth of a second ahead of his teammate Häkkinen. The two Ferrari drivers were third and fourth; Michael Schumacher ahead of Barrichello. Trulli set the fifth fastest time, with Kimi Räikkönen and Panis, sixth and seventh fastest respectively, their best times one-thousandth of a second apart. Panis' teammate Jacques Villeneuve was eighth fastest. Heidfeld and Ralf Schumacher, completed the top ten. Irvine's Jaguar car was afflicted with a problem on his out-lap; this prevented him from setting a timed lap.

In the second practice session, Häkkinen set the quickest lap of the day, a 1:16.408; Coulthard finished with the second fastest time. The Williams drivers were running quicker—Ralf Schumacher in third and Juan Pablo Montoya in sixth—they were separated by the Ferrari pair of Michael Schumacher and Barrichello, in fourth and fifth respectively. They were ahead of Trulli, Heidfeld, Jean Alesi and Panis.

The Saturday morning practice sessions were again held in overcast conditions, albeit with scattered sunshine. In the third practice session, Michael Schumacher set the session's fastest time with a lap of 1:16.308, almost three-tenths of a second faster than Ralf Schumacher. The McLaren drivers ran slower—Häkkinen ahead of Coulthard. Barrichello and Montoya rounded off the top six positions. In the final practice session, Ralf Schumacher was fastest, setting a time of 1:15.355, almost four tenths of a second faster than Montoya. Barrichello set the third fastest time, with Häkkinen and Coulthard fourth and fifth respectively. Michael Schumacher, who set the sixth fastest time, suffered from an hydraulic problem, thus limited his running.

Qualifying
Saturday's afternoon qualifying session lasted for an hour. During this session, the 107% rule was in effect, which necessitated each driver set a time within 107 per cent of the quickest lap to qualify for the race. Each driver was limited to twelve laps. Michael Schumacher clinched his seventh pole position of the season, with a time of 1:14.960. He was joined on the front row by Ralf Schumacher, who was two tenths of a second behind. Montoya qualified in third ahead of Barrichello, who took fourth after struggling with his car's power steering early in the session. Coulthard and Häkkinen filled the third row of the grid, their best times six thousands of a second apart. The Jordan and Sauber drivers rounded out the top ten positions. Villeneuve qualified in 11th, was quicker than his teammate Panis in 13th. The Arrows and Minardi drivers qualified at the back of the grid, covering positions 18 to 22, with Jenson Button.

Qualifying classification

Warm-up
The drivers took to the track at 09:30 (GMT +1) for a 30-minute warm-up session. Both Ferrari cars maintained their good performance from qualifying; Barrichello had the fastest time of 1:18.209; Michael Schumacher was second in the other Ferrari car. Ralf Schumacher was just off Michael Schumacher's pace, with Irvine rounding out the top four.

Race

The race started at 14:00 local time. A total of approximately 150,000 spectators attended the race. Whilst on a reconnaissance lap, Michael Schumacher, driving a spare Ferrari car, failed to make the grid for which he commandeered a motor scooter back to the pit lane and took his racing car to the grid. Tarso Marques, from 22nd on the grid, stalled his Minardi car at the start of the formation lap.

At the start, Michael Schumacher, Ralf Schumacher and Montoya all maintained their grid positions. Behind the leading trio, Barrichello made the worst start of the grid, moving from 4th to 7th place. Jos Verstappen, from 19th on the grid, made the best start, moving up five places to 14th position. At the completion of the first lap, Michael Schumacher led from Ralf Schumacher, Montoya, Coulthard, Häkkinen, Trulli, Barrichello, Heidfeld, Räikkönen and Frentzen.

Michael Schumacher and Ralf Schumacher were the first two lead drivers to make pitstops by coming in on Lap 28. As Michael Schumacher entered the pitlane, he ran wide forcing him to cut in front of Ralf Schumacher. As both drivers exited the pitlane, Ralf Schumacher cut to the left of the pitlane, crossing over the white line upon exiting.

As Michael Schumacher extended his lead, the stewards informed the Williams team that Ralf Schumacher would be served with a 10-second stop-go penalty. Ralf Schumacher took his penalty on Lap 39 and dropped from 2nd to 4th position.

Post-race

The top three drivers appeared on the podium and in the subsequent press conference. Michael Schumacher said was delighted with his race victory. He also revealed that Ferrari were doubtful about racing the spare car which was to be used for one installation lap.

The race result left Michael Schumacher extending his lead in the Drivers' Championship with 68 points. Coulthard's was second on 44 points, eighteen points ahead of Barrichello and nineteen ahead of Ralf Schumacher. In the Constructors' Championship, Ferrari maintained their lead with 94 points, McLaren maintained second with 53 points, and Williams remained third on 37 points, with 8 races of the season remaining.

Race classification
Drivers who scored championship points are denoted in bold.

Championship standings after the race

Drivers' Championship standings

Constructors' Championship standings

 Note: Only the top five positions are included for both sets of standings.

References

European Grand Prix
European Grand Prix
European Grand Prix
June 2001 sports events in Europe